Buffelshoek is a community in Bushbuckridge Local municipality (formerly known as Mapulaneng) in the Mpumalanga province of South Africa. The legal name was changed to Bolla-Tau in 2008.

References

Populated places in the Bushbuckridge Local Municipality